MOJOFLY is a pop-rock band from the Philippines.

History

1998-1999:Beginning, the release of Birthday album

the band was formed in 1999 by bassist Ricci Gurango after his departure from Hungry Young Poets, he added members includes Jun Jun Regalado III on drums, Raymond Galangco on guitars & Katrina Nadal on vocals the band released first single "Minamalas" written by Ricci Gurango, the single was played on radio stations and become the #2 most requested OPM song on pop station RX 93.1, and charting on other Manila FM stations as well. and their debut album "Birthday" were released in September 1999, the album consists of 14 songs 5 were written in Tagalog, two tracks (Puro Palusot & Half Wishing) were written by Rico Blanco and will be feature on the song "Half Wishing".

A Million Stories: 2001-2002
In December 2001, Guitarist Raymond Golamco left the band to concentrate on another career. and their follow up album A Million Stories was released in 2002, The album helped propel singles such as Another Day and Scooter Boy to national recognition. on the same year Drummer JunJun Regalado left the band.

The Departure of Kitchie Nadal
In June 2003, Nadal left the group to embark on a solo career. Her last gig with the band took place at June 14 at Robinsons Metro East.

Lougee Basabas Era
Mojofly then introduced Lougee Basabas as the band's new frontwoman in only a matter of days. By year's end the group joined the “indie” bandwagon with their self-titled EP (featuring the singles “Turn,” “Mata” and a recycled arrangement of their 1999 single “Minamalas“), sold-out despite being available only in gigs. Because of Mata and the revived, revv-ed up Lougee-version of Minamalas, MOJOFLY (EP) showed the new sound of their group. In January 2005, the band is back to the studio to record their upcoming album to be released in March 2005.

The band went on to release an LP aptly entitled MOJOFLY Now (June, 2005), still under independent label luKas Music of artist manager and music publisher Karin Araneta. This time distributed nationwide by EMI Music Philippines, Lougee took over the reins in songwriting and gained MOJOFLY “street cred” through her novel, cutting-edge compositions. Currently promoting MOJOFLY Now Special Edition (August, 2006), the 2-disc package marries the original ‘05 full-length and an A-VCD featuring live tracks from their first major concert at the Music Museum (September 2–3, 2005) and the 3D-animated music video of Tumatakbo.

MOJOFLY is the first local artist to venture into full 3D animation in Philippine music video history. The work was previewed at the 19th Singapore International Film Festival (April, 2006) and won Best Animated Video and Favorite Indie Video at the MTV Pilipinas Video Music Awards 2006] (August, 2006).

Apart from once garnering the much-coveted slot for MTV Lokal Artist-of-the-Month (March, 2005), MOJOFLY also boasts a list of celebrity endorsements from Del Monte Pizza Sauce to Penshoppe and Cream Silk Conditioners. The theme song Choose and vast multi-media exposure from the Cream Silk “Girl Power, Pink Power” campaign brought MOJOFLY's sound and Lougee's vivid image into every household.

Final Years 2007-2008
On 2008, bassist - Ricci Gurango, departed from the band. The remaining members (Lougee and Ali) took in Richard Carandang and Ace Evangelista to play the bass and lead guitar respectively. With the new members, the band decided to rename their group as DeLara.

DeLara
DeLara remained active from 2008 to 2011 and produced 2 studio albums (self-titled "DeLara", 2008 and "Just Free", 2010). After the separation of the band, Lougee Basabas went on to pursue a solo career performing in local venues and events. Shortly after, she auditioned for "The Voice of the Philippines" season 2 on ABS-CBN in 2014 and became part of Team Bamboo. A year later, Lougee married Ali Alejandro (Mojofly drummer since 2004) and were blessed with a baby boy named Leon in 2016.

The return of Mojofly
In 2015, Mojofly started to perform in small production events but was not publicly announcing their return to the local performing circuit yet. It was only later in the same year that they started to record their 4th studio album (2nd studio album with the 2nd generation Mojofly members Ali & Lougee) with Yellow Room Music Philippines, headed by Monty Macalino (vocalist of Mayonnaise (band)). The band was able to release 1 single entitled "Rally" in May 2018 for online and streaming platforms invoking that Mojofly is back with members Kiko Montecillo on Keyboards, Beejay Valera on Lead Guitars, and Mark Reese Gelbolingo on Bass.

Present Status
In March 2019,  Mojofly released their latest 8-track album entitled Mula Noon.

They also released two songs recorded during the 2020 COVID-19 pandemic, "Kapit-Lapit" and "Pwede Naman".

Their hit song "Tumatakbo" which won Best Animated Video at the MTV Pilipinas Music Awards in 2006 became the theme song of the fantasy-drama series The Lost Recipe which aired from January 18, 2021, on GMA Network.

Personnel
Current members
Lougee Basabas–Alejandro - vocals, guitars (2004–2008, 2015–present)
Ali Alejandro - drums (2006–2008, 2015–present)
Kiko Montecillo - keyboards (2018–present)
Beejay Valera - guitars
Mark Reese Gelbolingo - bass guitars
Early members
Kitchie Nadal - vocals, guitars (1999–2003)
JunJun Regelado - drums (1999–2002)
Raymond Golamco - guitars (1999–2001)
Ricci Gurango - bass guitars (1999–2008)
Allan Elgar - guitars (2004–2007)

Discography

Studio albums
 Birthday (Sony BMG Music Philippines) (1999)
 A Million Stories (Sony BMG Music Philippines) (2002)
 Now (luKas Music/EMI) (2005)
           
 Mula Noon (Yellow Room Music PH) (2019)

Singles
 "Rally" (Yellow Room Music PH) (2018)
 "Kapit-Lapit" (2020)
 "Pwede Naman" (self-produced) (2020)

Compilations
 MOJOFLY - EP (luKas Music) (2003)
           
 Now Special 2-Disc Edition (luKas Music/EMI) (2006)
 2 in 1 Series: MOJOFLY (Sony BMG Music Philippines) (2006)

Compilation appearances
 2006 Songs from Dawson's Creek Volume 2 - "Peak" (Asian Edition) (Sony BMG)

Awards and nominations

References

External links
 MOJOFLY Official Facebook Page
 Online Registry of Filipino Musical Artists and Their Works: Mojofly

Filipino rock music groups
Musical groups established in 1999
1999 establishments in the Philippines